The 2012 Washington Huskies football team represented the University of Washington in the 2012 NCAA Division I FBS football season. The team, coached by fourth-year head coach Steve Sarkisian, was a member of the North Division of the Pac-12 Conference. The Huskies played their home games at CenturyLink Field in Seattle due to renovations at their normal on-campus home of Husky Stadium, also in Seattle. They finished the season 7–6, 5–4 in Pac-12 play to finish in fourth place in the North Division. They were invited to the Maaco Bowl Las Vegas where they were defeated by Boise State.

Offseason
Following the Alamo Bowl coach Sarkisian fired nearly all of his defensive coaches, deciding to retain only defensive line coach/special teams coordinator Johnny Nansen. Shortly thereafter, offensive coordinator Doug Nussmeier left the program to accept a similar position at Alabama. Sarkisian filled his defensive staff with Justin Wilcox as defensive coordinator, Peter Sirmon as linebackers coach, Tosh Lupoi as defensive line coach, and Keith Heyward as defensive backs coach. He filled the open offensive coordinator position with former Cal assistant Eric Kiesau. Junior offensive lineman Colin Porter, who had started 19 games in two seasons, was forced to retire from football due to degenerative arthritis in both of his shoulders.

Schedule

Rankings

Weekly Starters
The following players were the weekly offensive and defensive game starters.

Roster and coaching staff

Game summaries

San Diego State

LSU

Portland State

Stanford

1st quarter scoring: STAN – Jordan Williamson 31-yard field goal; WASH – Travis Coons 43-yard field goal
  
2nd quarter scoring:  STAN – Williamson 28-yard field goal

3rd quarter scoring:  STAN – Trent Murphy 40-yard interception return (Williamson kick); WASH – Bishop Sankey 61-yard run (Coons kick)

4th quarter scoring: WASH – Kasen Williams 35-yard pass from Keith Price (Coons kick)

Oregon

USC

Arizona

Oregon State

California

Utah

Colorado

Washington State

This was the Huskies' last loss to the Cougars until 2021.

Boise State–Maaco Bowl Las Vegas

Notes
 September 4, 2012 — Jesse Callier out of the season due to a torn right knee anterior cruciate ligament; Ben Riva had a fractured forearm.

References

Washington
Washington Huskies football seasons
Washington Huskies football